Jules-Claude Ziegler (1804-1856) was a French painter, ceramicist and photographer of the French school.

Ziegler was born in 1804 in Langres, Haute-Marne. He was appointed knight of the Légion d'Honneur in 1825. He was the pupil of Dominique Ingres and began to participate exhibitions at the Salon in 1832.

The half-dome above the altar in the Église de la Madeleine is frescoed by Jules-Claude Ziegler.

Works

 Vue de Venise la nuit (1832) bought by Louis-Philippe Ier
 Venise vue de nuit (1833), sketch, musée des Beaux-Arts de Nantes
 Portrait of the Cardinal Montalte (1833)
 Le Doge Foscari rentrant dans son palais après son abdication (1833), Arras, museum
 Giotto chez Cimabue (1833), musée des Beaux-Arts de Bordeaux
  Saint Matthieu (1834), Condom Cathedral
 Saint Georges terrassant le dragon (1834), Saint-Omer, église Notre-Dame, a replica at the musée des Beaux-Arts de Nancy
 Louis de Champagne, comte de Sancerre, Maréchal de France en 1368, Connétable en 1397 (1835) - Château de Versailles
 Maréchal Kellerman (1835), Paris, Sénat
 Le prophète Daniel dans la fosse aux lions (1838), Musée de Nantes  (a replica in Langres)
 L'Histoire du Christianisme (1836-1838), église de la Madeleine, Paris
 Saint Luc peignant la Vierge (1839), museum of Dunkerque, a copy at the Musée Magnin of Dijon
 L'Imagination (1839), Langres, museum (esquisse au Haggerty Museum of art, Marquette University, Milwaukee)
 Le Bon Pasteur (1839), Montpellier, musée Fabre
 La foi (stained glass), (1839) Eu, church
 Autoportrait
 Paysage d'hiver, Haute-Marne, personal collection 
 Notre-Dame des Neiges (1844), museum of Bourbonne-les-Bains
 La Rosée répandant ses perles sur les fleurs (1844), Museum of Langres
 Femme à sa toilette, une Vénitienne, (1844), châteaux de Malmaison et Bois-Préau
 Judith aux portes de Béthulie (1847), musée des beaux-arts de Lyon
 Le Songe de Jacob (1847)
 La République (1848), musée des Beaux-Arts de Lille
 Les Pasteurs de la Bible, (1850) museum de Dijon
 Pluie d'été, 1850, museum of Saint-Dizier
 Charles Quint, devenu moine, renvoyant son portrait avec les insignes de l'empire, à Londres
 Henri II et Diane de Poitiers
 Agnès Sorel et Charles VII
 Le Cardinal Gighi faisant des excuses à Louis XIV, museum of Versailles (1834)
 le Rosaire : Saint Dominique et Sainte Catherine, church of Ouge
 La Paix d'Amiens (1853), Amiens, Tribunal
 Portrait of Marquis de Coislin
 La Vierge de Bourgogne, museum of Langres
 Immaculée conception (1856), not finished, Museum of Langres

References
    

1804 births
1856 deaths
People from Langres
French ceramists
French photographers
Pioneers of photography
Chevaliers of the Légion d'honneur
19th-century French painters
French landscape painters
French portrait painters
French male painters
19th-century French sculptors
French male sculptors
French curators
19th-century French male artists